Rathenow is a town in the district of Havelland in Brandenburg, Germany, with a population of 24,063 (2020).

Overview
The Protestant church of St. Marien Andreas, originally a basilica, and transformed to the Gothic style in 1517-1589, and the Roman Catholic Church of St. George, are noteworthy.

Rathenow is known for being the former capital of eyewear manufacturing in East Germany. It is also known for its stones, called Rathenow stones.

After the fall of the Soviet Union, it was revealed that the remains of Hitler and his assistants were secretly buried in graves near Rathenow.

Demography

Twin towns — sister cities

Rathenow is twinned with:
 Złotów, Poland
 Rendsburg, Germany

Notable people

 Christian Beeck (born 1971), footballer
 Stephan Bodecker (1384–1459), Bishop of Brandenburg
 Jörg Friedrich (rower) (born 1959), rower
 Jörg Freimuth (born 1961), high jumper
 Jörg Heinrich (born 1969), football player and manager
 Wulf Herzogenrath (born 1944), art historian and curator
 Rosemarie Köhn (born 1939), 1993-2006 Bishop of Hamar (Norway) (world's second woman as a Lutheran bishop)
 Joachim Mrugowsky (1905–1948), physician and Nazi war criminal; executed
 Mario Streit (born 1967), rower
 Immo Stabreit (born 1933), diplomat
George William Ziemann (1809–1881), Christian Missionary

References

External links

Localities in Havelland